The 2023 Fresno State Bulldogs football team  represent California State University, Fresno as a member of the Mountain West Conference during the 2023 NCAA Division I FBS football season. They will be led by head coach Jeff Tedford, who was coaching his fifth overall season with the program. The Bulldogs played their home games at Valley Children’s Stadium in Fresno, California.

Schedule

References

Fresno State
Fresno State Bulldogs football seasons